NGC 838 is an unbarred lenticular galaxy located at approximately 170 million light-years away in the constellation of Cetus. It is part of the Hickson Compact Group 16.

References

External links

Unbarred lenticular galaxies
Cetus (constellation)
0838
008250